India–Pakistan border skirmishes may refer to:
2011 India–Pakistan border skirmish
2013 India–Pakistan border skirmishes
2014–2015 India–Pakistan border skirmishes
2016–2018 India–Pakistan border skirmishes
2019 India–Pakistan border skirmishes
2020–21 India–Pakistan border skirmishes

See also
 Indo-Pakistani wars and conflicts
 Sino-Indian skirmish (disambiguation)
 Indian War (disambiguation)